Nikolay Stepanenko (born 1956, Gomel Oblast, Belarus) is a Soviet sprint canoeist who competed in the late 1970s. He won three medals in the K-1 10000 m event at the ICF Canoe Sprint World Championships with a silver (1978) and two bronzes (1977, 1979).

References

Living people
Soviet male canoeists
Belarusian male canoeists
ICF Canoe Sprint World Championships medalists in kayak
1956 births